Lauren Richardson may refer to:

Lauren Richardson, character played by Melissa Ponzio
Lauren Richardson, contestant in Love Island (2015 TV series)